Antonin Leonard Maurice Ghislain, Knight de Selliers de Moranville (Saint-Josse-ten-Noode 1852 – Ixelles 1945) was a Belgian military officer.

Early life 
He was born into a Catholic noble family; his father was Léonard de Selliers de Moranville, knight of Selliers de Moranville (1803–1856). He married Octavie Hector, with whom he had  7 children. Until 1869 he studied at the École Royale Militaire.

Career 
Until 1914 he was Commander in Chief of the Gendarmerie (a military force with law enforcement duties. He was Chief Commander of the Belgian army from 25 May until 6 September 1914. During his assignment the Kingdom was invaded by German troops and the Belgian mobilization started. On 6 September he was dismissed by the King, under the advice of Lieutenant General Baron Louis de Ryckel. The same Decree abolished the function of Chief of Staff. In this way the King secured control of the force.

He is buried in the cemetery of Neder-Over-Heembeek.

Honours 
 : 
 Croix de Guerre.
 Grand Officer in the Order of Leopold.
 Grand Officer in the Order of the Crown.
 : Grand Cordon in the Imperial Order of Saint Anna.
 : Grand Officer in the Order of Orange-Nassau.
:  Honorary Knight Commander in the Most Distinguished Order of Saint Michael and Saint George.
:  Knight Commander in the Royal Military Order of Our Lord Jesus Christ.
: Knight in the Legion of Honour.
: Knight of the Order of the Redeemer.
 Honorary Citizen of Rouen.

References

Belgian Army generals of World War I
Honorary Knights Commander of the Order of St Michael and St George
Belgian knights
Commanders of the Order of Christ (Portugal)
Grand Officers of the Order of Orange-Nassau
People from Saint-Josse-ten-Noode
Royal Military Academy (Belgium) alumni
1852 births
1945 deaths